The Comedy Circus Show  is an Indian  comedy show that aired on Sony Entertainment Television.

Overview

Comedy Circus 1: Hindi TV Show where daily soap stars perform stand-up comedy. Paired with the "finest" stand up talent from India and Pakistan. These soap stars perform stand-up comedy along with their comedian partners on stage. Show went live for 13 weeks in a grueling battle for supremacy to decide which pair will be the best stand-up comic.

The show was created by the Optimystix Entertainment, this Mega Laugh Riot with the tag line of 'Jodi Jamegi, Public Hassegi' guarantees hysterics on Sony TV.

Comedy Circus 2: Comedy TV Show that started its second season at Sony TV on 26 April 2008. The popular television actors and professional stand-up comedians were paired to perform on a highly competitive stage. Jodis (Pair or teams of two) were scored by the judges and the live studio audience to determine eliminations.

Kaante Ki Takkar: After Comedy Circus 1 & 2, Kaante Ki Takkar was the new comedy TV show which had the jodis of Comedy Circus 1 led by Archana Puran Singh versus the jodis of Comedy Circus 2, led by Shekhar Suman. The team of Archana Puran Singh were called as The Purans while the team of Shekhar Suman were called as The Sumans.

Shruti Seth was replaced by Purbi Joshi.

Chinchpokli To China: Another popular reality-based comedy TV Show from Sony Entertainment Television. This is the fourth season of Comedy Circus franchise comes with the tagline "Comedy Circus Chinchpokli to China – Jaha se koi bhi hanse bina jayena". It is a comedy based show like all the Comedy Circus seasons with a slight twist in the plot. Comedy Circus featured comedians in pairs to perform skits and impress the judges and get scored by them. Hosted by Purbi Joshi.

Comedy Circus 20-20: Comes with gags, jokes, laughter, hilarious acts, etc. adding the flavor of IPL (Indian Premier League) season. The stand-up performances were based on the happenings in IPL how cricket affects our daily lives and everything related to the game. The show will be hosted by Shruti Seth and the judges are Shekhar Suman and cricketer Ajay Jadeja.

Dekh India Dekh: Sixth season of the popular stand-up comedy series of Comedy Circus. It was aired on SonyTV and premiered on 30 May 2009. Ended on 30 October 2009. Shekar Suman who was seen hosting Dekh India Dekh will now be back as judge partnering Archana Puran Singh. This new format will see a new host in Shweta Gulati.

Teen(3) Ka Tadka: The unique reality-based comedy format with celebrities performing with professional stand-up comedian partners on a highly competitive stage. This time season offers the show with a new twist with not Jodis but Trios. The Tadka will be a unique hurdle that will be put before every Jodi in the form of a third contestant who will be a celebrity. Three is not a crowd but a spicy (tadka). Show was aired on 24 October 2009. Hosted by Mouni Roy, later by Roshni Chopra.

Comedy Circus Ke Superstars premiered on 24 October 2009. The first episode also contained Govinda who introduced new artists and was guest judge.

Comedy Circus – Maha Sangram  involved contestants of three previous seasons. Archana represented season 1, Shekhar represented season 2 and Rohit represented season 3. Teams were scored by the opposite team representatives, with the audience watching the show to determine eliminations. The winners of this show were Swapnil Joshi and VIP .

A new season of the show has started on 15 September 2018.

Comedy Circus 2018

This was a comeback for the comedy circus franchise. Aired on 15 September 2018, this season had new talent, new styles of comedy and new ways of scoring. The scoring would depend upon the laughter of the judges, like if they would experience 'mand mand' laughter the team would get 2500 rupees, for every 'HaHakar' laughter team gets 5000 rupees and for every 'phephada phad' laughter they would get 10000 rupees.

Season summary

Production 
This show was produced by Vipul D. Shah through his TV shows production company Optimistics. It was filmed in studios of Goregaon, Mumbai.

Comedy Circus Ke SuperStars – 2010 Contestants

 Kapil Sharma & Parvati Sehgal (winners)
 Kapil Sharma & Natasha Sharma
 Krushna Abhishek & Sudesh Lehri (runner-up)
 Rajeev Thakur & Saloni Daini
 Paresh Ganatra & Bharti Singh
 Sunil Pal & Priya Marathe

Comedy Circus Mahasangram – 2010 Contestants 
Team Purans:
VIP & Swapnil Joshi
 Khayali & Karishma Tanna

Team Sumans:
Krushna Abhishek & Sudesh Lehri
 Rajiv Nigam & Rajesh Kumar

Team Shettys:
Paresh Ganatra, Bharti Singh & Sharad Kelkar
Rajiv Thakur, Saloni Daini & Rashmi Desai

Comedy Circus 3 (Teen) Ka Tadka – 2009 Contestants 
 Sudesh Lehri, Krushna Abhishek, Melissa Pais (winners)
 Parul Chauhan, Bhagwant Mann, & Jennifer Winget
 Anup Soni, Shweta Tiwari, & Rehman Khan
 Sanjay Mishra, Bhairavi Raichura, & Raja Sagoo
 Harsh Chhaya, Tina Dutta, & Jimmy Moses
 Sharad Kelkar, Bharti Singh, & Paresh Ganatra
 Rajiv Thakur, Smita Singh, & Saloni Daini
 Rajiv Thakur, Rashmi Desai, & Saloni Daini

Dekh India Dekh – 2009 Contestants 

 Rajesh Kumar as Akbar
 Rajiv Nigam as Birbal
 Ali Asgar as Havaldar Kadam
 VIP as Havaldar Kaale
 Krushna Abhishek as Baiju
 Sudesh Lehri as Bawra
 Gaurav Gera as Malti Manohar Mishra
 Swapnil Joshi as Jignesh Shah
 Tulika as Bhavana Ben 
Kosher

Comedy Circus 2020 – 2009 Contestants 

 Nigaar Khan and Raja Sagoo (winners)
 Roshni Chopra and Kuldeep Dubey
 Rakshanda Khan and Rehman Khan
 Vinod Kambli and Rajbeer Kaur

Chinchpokli to China – 2009 Contestants 

 Krushna Abhishek & Sudesh Lehri
 Shweta Tiwari & Ashutosh Kaushik
 Kuldeep Dubey & Roshni Chopra
 Ahsaan Qureshi & Payal Rohatgi
 Sucheta Trivedi & Paresh Ganatra
 VIP & Shweta Gulati
 Ali Asgar & Kuldeep Dubey
 Swapnil Joshi & Sharad Kelkar
 Kavita Kaushik & Rajiv Nigam
 Kuldeep Dubey & Rajiv Nigam
 Shailesh Lodha & Neha Marda
 Mona Singh & Rehman Khan
 Khayali & Nigaar Khan
 Rehman Khan & Sucheta Trivedi
 Kuldeep Dubey & Sucheta Trivedi
Sidharth sagar & Nandini kapoor

Kaante Ki Takkar – 2008 Contestants 
Team Purans:
Urvashi Dholakia & Shakeel Siddiqui
VIP & Swapnil Joshi
 Khayali & Karishma Tanna

Team Sumans:

Krushna Abhishek & Sudesh Lehri
 Rajiv Nigam & Rajesh Kumar
Kamya Panjabi & Rajeev Thakur

Comedy Circus 2 – 2008 Contestants 

 Juhi Parmar & Vijay Ishwarlal Pawar (VIP) – Winner
Kamya Panjabi & Rajiv Thakur – 1st Runners-up
Krushna Abhishek & Sudesh Lehri – 2nd Runners-up
 Apara Mehta & Shailesh Lodha
Shayantani Ghosh & Kuldeep Dubey
 Sucheta Khanna & Salim Afridi
 Akashdeep Sehgal & Pervez Siddiqui
 Rajesh Kumar & Rajeev Nigam
 Chitrashi Rawat & Rehman Khan

Comedy Circus 1 – 2007 Contestants 

 Kashif Khan & Ali Asgar- Winners
 Swapnil Joshi & V.I.P.- Runner-up
 Khayali Saharan & Karishma Tanna- Voted Out
Urvashi Dholakia & Shakeel Siddiqui – Voted Out
Kiran Karmakar & Sunil Sanwra – Voted Out
 Pratap Faujdar & Ketaki Dave replaced by Manini De – Voted Out
Varun Badola & Deepak Dutta – Voted Out

References

External links
Official site on Sony Liv

Indian reality television series
Indian stand-up comedy television series
2007 Indian television series debuts
Sony Entertainment Television original programming
2010s Indian television series
Television series by Optimystix Entertainment